Dorothy Bishop may refer to:
Dorothy V. M. Bishop (born 1952) psychologist
Dorothy Bishop, entertainer